Eupithecia tricrossa is a moth in the family Geometridae. It is found in the southern Himalaya, from Nepal to Tibet, Sikkim, Bhutan, north-eastern India and northern Myanmar.

References

Moths described in 1926
tricrossa
Moths of Asia